Carlos Enrique Nolasco (born December 13, 1982) is an American former professional baseball pitcher. He played in Major League Baseball (MLB) for the Florida/Miami Marlins,  Los Angeles Dodgers, Minnesota Twins, and Los Angeles Angels. He is of Mexican descent.

Early life
Born in Corona, California to Mexican parents, Nolasco attended Rialto High School in Rialto, California. He graduated in 2001 and was drafted out of high school in the fourth round of the 2001 Major League Baseball draft by the Chicago Cubs.

Professional career

Chicago Cubs
Nolasco began his professional career in the Rookie-level Arizona League with the Arizona League Cubs. In five games with the team, including four starts, he recorded a 1–0 win–loss record with an earned-run average (ERA) of 1.50. He spent the 2002 season with the Boise Hawks of the Class A-Short Season Northwest League, earning a record of 7–2 with an ERA of 2.48 in 15 starts. The next season, Nolasco was assigned to the Daytona Cubs of the Class A-Advanced Florida State League, where he went 11–5 with a 2.96 ERA in 26 starts.

Nolasco started the 2004 season in the Double-A (AA) Southern League with the West Tenn Diamond Jaxx. A month into the season, on May 16, he was called up to the Triple-A Iowa Cubs of the Pacific Coast League. He made nine starts for Iowa, accumulating a record of 2–3 with an ERA of 9.30 before being sent back down to AA on June 28. Nolasco spent the rest of the season there; he finished the season with a record of 6-4 and an ERA of 3.70 in 19 starts throughout both stints with the Diamond Jaxx during the 2004 season. Nolasco then spent the entire 2005 season in AA as he achieved an impressive 14–3 record with an ERA of 2.89 in 27 starts. Nolasco received the Southern League’s Most Outstanding Pitcher Award for the 2005 season.

Florida/Miami Marlins

The Florida Marlins acquired Nolasco, Sergio Mitre, and Renyel Pinto from the Cubs for Juan Pierre on December 7, 2005. He made the opening day roster in 2006 and made his debut with 3 scoreless innings of relief on April 5 against the Houston Astros. He struck out Jason Lane for his first Major League strikeout. He recorded his first win with 2 innings of relief against the Cubs on April 26. He made his first start on May 22, also against the Cubs, and allowed 1 run in 7 innings to get the win.

Nolasco missed most of the 2007 season with an injury and then started the 2008 season as a middle reliever, but quickly found his way to the top of the rotation as Florida's top starting pitcher. On August 19, 2008, he pitched a two-hitter against the San Francisco Giants. With one out in the 9th inning, he gave up a double; the only other hit given up by him was a ball deflected off the glove of first baseman Mike Jacobs.  Nolasco also had a two-run double in the game. Nolasco won 15 games in 2008, putting him in the top 5 in wins in the National League.

Nolasco was named the 2009 Opening Day starter, throwing in six innings and win against the Washington Nationals. On September 30, 2009, Nolasco struck out 16 batters, breaking A. J. Burnett's record for 14 strikeouts in a single game for the Florida Marlins.

In December 2010, Nolasco agreed to a contract extension with the Marlins to remain with the team through 2013.

On August 23, 2011, Nolasco became the Marlins franchise leader in strikeouts, overtaking Dontrelle Willis. A year later on May 22, 2012 he won his 69th game, overtaking Willis' club record of 68 wins with the Marlins. He finished the season with a 4.48 ERA in 191 innings pitched, with 47 walks, 125 strikeouts, a 1.37 WHIP, and a 12–13 record.

Los Angeles Dodgers

On July 6, 2013, he was traded to the Los Angeles Dodgers for Josh Wall, and two minor league pitchers Steve Ames, and Ángel Sánchez. He made 15 starts for the Dodgers and was 8–3 with a 3.52 ERA. Nolasco is the only Marlins pitcher to have both over 1,000 innings pitched and 1,000 strikeouts.

Minnesota Twins
On November 27, 2013, Nolasco agreed to terms with the Minnesota Twins on a four-year, $49 million contract. In his first season as a Twin, Nolasco posted a disappointing 5.38 ERA in 27 starts. Nolasco's 2015 season was cut short due to injury, recording a 6.75 ERA in 8 starts while also appearing in one game out of the bullpen. For the 2016 season, Nolasco competed for a rotation spot with Tyler Duffey. Duffey ended up being sent down to AAA before the season began, anointing Nolasco the 5th starter. He continued his regression from his previous two seasons, registering an ERA of 5.13 in 21 starts for the Twins. Nolasco ended his two and half seasons with the Twins with a 15–22 record.

Los Angeles Angels
On August 1, 2016, the Twins traded Nolasco with Alex Meyer plus cash in exchange for Angels pitchers Hector Santiago and Alan Busenitz. He had the lowest zone percentage of all major league pitchers, with only 39.1% of his pitches being in the strike zone.

For the 2017 season, Nolasco was chosen to be the Angels' Opening Day starting pitcher. Nolasco's 2017 season was his worst season of his career, finishing with a record of 6-15 with a 4.92 ERA in 33 starts.

Kansas City Royals
Nolasco signed a minor league contract with the Kansas City Royals on March 7, 2018. He was released on March 24.

Arizona Diamondbacks
On February 8, 2019, Nolasco signed a minor league contract with the Arizona Diamondbacks that included an invitation to spring training. He elected free agency on November 7, 2019.

Pitching style
Nolasco throws five pitches: a four-seam fastball, a sinker, a split-finger fastball, a slider, and a knuckle curve .

Personal life
Nolasco goes by the first name "Ricky" because his father named his son after his favorite Dodger, Rick Monday. Nolasco's older brother, Dave, attended Riverside Community College and was selected by the Milwaukee Brewers in the 23rd round of the 2001 MLB draft.

See also

 List of Miami Marlins team records

References

External links

1982 births
Living people
Florida Marlins players
Miami Marlins players
Los Angeles Dodgers players
Minnesota Twins players
Los Angeles Angels players
Boise Hawks players
Daytona Cubs players
Iowa Cubs players
West Tennessee Diamond Jaxx players
Jupiter Hammerheads players
Gulf Coast Marlins players
Albuquerque Isotopes players
Carolina Mudcats players
New Orleans Zephyrs players
Peoria Saguaros players
Cedar Rapids Kernels players
American baseball players of Mexican descent
Baseball players from California
Major League Baseball pitchers
Sportspeople from Corona, California
Arizona League Cubs players
Sportspeople from Rialto, California